Chance Bateman (born 21 June 1981) is an Australian rules football coach and former player who played for the Hawthorn Football Club in the Australian Football League.

Bateman was Hawthorn's first indigenous player to reach 100 games, first Aboriginal life member, and the club's longest-serving WA recruit. He was a development coach at the West Coast Eagles until the end of the 2020 season.

Early career
Bateman learnt his football during his formative years in York and then with Perth in Westar Rules. He was an under 18 all Australian and in the squad for the Westar state side in 1999.

AFL career

Drafted by Hawthorn at pick 48 in the 1999 AFL Draft, the Hawks considered themselves lucky as they thought he would have been picked up earlier. His light frame made him a longer term prospect as he would require to develop more physically. His early career was interrupted by a variety of injuries. Each time he bounced back and became a key member of the team.

I'd stay at Hawthorn for as long as they'd have me, they've been fantastic for me. You don't really think too much about the milestones as they're coming up, but as you pass them you sort of look back with a bit of pride. I'm our first indigenous life member and to have had a small part in the club's history is pretty special.

In 2006 he managed to play 21 games and came 12th in the club Best and Fairest award. Bateman was known for his trademark dreadlocks. Bateman was one of Hawthorn's most valuable players. His speed and hardness at the ball while playing on the wing allowed the team to play a free flowing brand of game. He averaged 20 possessions a game in his 21 games in 2006 and was hitting top form just before the 2007 season.

His elite speed was recognised and he was named in the 2006 International Rules Series side to tour Ireland.

Bateman said a major career highlight was when he captained the Hawks in an indigenous round victory over West Coast at Launceston in 2007 when the Eagles were led by David Wirrpanda.

Bateman kicked Hawthorn's first goal in the 2008 Grand Final. Bateman had his dreadlocks cut off for charity after the Grand Final victory. The money was donated to the Rioli Fund, set up to improve Aboriginal health throughout Australia.

Along with captain Sam Mitchell, Bateman was the only Hawthorn player to play in all games in 2009. Bateman was put on Hawthorn's veterans list in 2011.

Statistics

|- style=background:#EAEAEA
| 2000 ||  || 10
| 3 || 1 || 3 || 14 || 2 || 16 || 4 || 1 || 0.3 || 1.0 || 4.7 || 0.7 || 5.3 || 1.3 || 0.3  || 0
|-
| 2001 ||  || 10
| 4 || 0 || 0 || 27 || 12 || 39 || 11 || 5 || 0.0 || 0.0 || 6.8 || 3.0 || 9.8 || 2.8 || 1.3 || 0
|- style=background:#EAEAEA
| 2002 ||  || 10
| 11 || 3 || 2 || 95 || 32 || 127 || 29 || 15 || 0.3 || 0.2 || 8.6 || 2.9 || 11.5 || 2.6 || 1.4 || 0
|-
| 2003 ||  || 10
| 11 || 2 || 0 || 107 || 45 || 152 || 36 || 16 || 0.2 || 0.0 || 9.7 || 4.1 || 13.8 || 3.3 || 1.5 || 2
|- style=background:#EAEAEA
| 2004 ||  || 10
| 13 || 8 || 2 || 112 || 49 || 161 || 35 || 24 || 0.6 || 0.2 || 8.6 || 3.8 || 12.4 || 2.7 || 1.8 || 4
|-
| 2005 ||  || 10
| 12 || 4 || 3 || 165 || 81 || 246 || 52 || 19 || 0.3 || 0.3 || 13.8 || 6.8 || 20.5 || 4.3 || 1.6 || 3
|- style=background:#EAEAEA
| 2006 ||  || 10
| 21 || 5 || 7 || 270 || 146 || 416 || 123 || 22 || 0.2 || 0.3 || 12.9 || 7.0 || 19.8 || 5.9 || 1.0 || 6
|-
| 2007 ||  || 10
| 21 || 7 || 6 || 221 || 127 || 348 || 109 || 30 || 0.3 || 0.3 || 10.5 || 6.0 || 16.6 || 5.2 || 1.4 || 3
|- style=background:#EAEAEA
| bgcolor="F0E68C" | 2008# ||  || 10
| 21 || 9 || 7 || 275 || 161 || 436 || 110 || 52 || 0.4 || 0.3 || 13.1 || 7.7 || 20.8 || 5.2 || 2.5 || 9
|-
| 2009 ||  || 10
| 22 || 13 || 14 || 264 || 236 || 500 || 115 || 56 || 0.6 || 0.6 || 12.0 || 10.7 || 22.7 || 5.2 || 2.5 || 3
|- style=background:#EAEAEA
| 2010 ||  || 10
| 18 || 5 || 9 || 168 || 130 || 298 || 72 || 39 || 0.3 || 0.5 || 9.3 || 7.2 || 16.6 || 4.0 || 2.2 || 0
|-
| 2011 ||  || 10
| 17 || 10 || 6 || 147 || 102 || 249 || 73 || 36 || 0.6 || 0.4 || 8.6 || 6.0 || 14.6 || 4.3 || 2.1 || 0
|- style=background:#EAEAEA
| 2012 ||  || 10
| 3 || 0 || 0 || 19 || 9 || 28 || 4 || 4 || 0.0 || 0.0 || 6.3 || 3.0 || 9.3 || 1.3 || 1.3 || 0
|- class="sortbottom"
! colspan=3| Career
! 177 !! 67 !! 59 !! 1884 !! 1132 !! 3016 !! 773 !! 319 !! 0.4 !! 0.3 !! 10.6 !! 6.4 !! 17.0 !! 4.4 !! 1.8 !! 30
|}

Honours and achievements
Team
 AFL premiership player: 2008
 Minor premiership: 2012
 VFL premiership player: 2001

Individual
 Australia international rules football team: 2006
 Indigenous All-Stars team: 2003
  life member

References

External links

 

Indigenous Australian players of Australian rules football
Hawthorn Football Club players
Hawthorn Football Club Premiership players
Indigenous Australians from Western Australia
Perth Football Club players
1981 births
Living people
Australian rules footballers from Perth, Western Australia
People from York, Western Australia
Sportsmen from Western Australia
Box Hill Football Club players
Australia international rules football team players
One-time VFL/AFL Premiership players